This is a list of the top-selling singles in New Zealand for 2013 from the Official New Zealand Music Chart's end-of-year chart, compiled by Recorded Music NZ.

Chart 

Key
 – Song of New Zealand origin

Top 20 singles of 2013 by New Zealand artists 

Key
 – Songs that appeared on the Top 50 Chart.

Chart by numbers

Origin

By artist
The following shows the country of origin from where the artist (including any featured artist where applicable) originate from. Artists who appear more than once have only been tallied once.

By single
The following shows the country of origin from which the singles originate regardless of who the artist is.

Most singles
Shows the artists with the most singles to appear in this chart. Includes where they appear as a featured artist, however where a singer (e.g. Adam Levine) appears as a guest singer, this does not count towards their groups (e.g. Maroon 5) tally.

Format
The following shows where each single appears on, whether it was the artists album, a non-album single, an extended play or as part of a soundtrack.

Multiple releases
The following shows singles that had multiple releases from the same album.

Type
The following shows the denomination that each single was released as, whether as a solo artist or as part of a group, band or duo. Also shows how many singles had guest artists.

Top Genre
The following shows the most common genres the Top 50 singles are regarded as (as per their genre descriptions in the singles entries. Where a genre was not noted, the genre of the album/extended play was used instead.

Top Labels
The following shows the most common record labels that a single was associated with. Any label that only had one single has not been noted.

Top songwriters
The following shows the songwriters who had the most top-selling singles of 2014 in New Zealand.

Most/Least songwriters
The following shows the singles that were credited as having been written by only one person and the singles that had the most credited writers of 2014.

Top producers
The following shows the producers who had the most singles to appear on this chart.

Notes

References 

 Top Selling NZ Singles of 2013

External links 
 The Official NZ Music Chart - singles

2013 in New Zealand music
2013 record charts
Singles 2013